Ropicosybra multipunctata is a species of beetle in the family Cerambycidae. It was described by Pic in 1927. It is known from Vietnam.

References

Apomecynini
Beetles described in 1927